Stanislava Andreyevna Konstantinova (born 14 July 2000) is a Russian figure skater. She is the 2019 Winter Universiade bronze medalist, 2018 Grand Prix of Helsinki silver medalist, a two-time CS Tallinn Trophy champion (2016, 2017) and the 2017 CS Warsaw Cup silver medalist.

On the junior level, she is the 2016 JGP Russia silver medalist, the 2017 JGP Belarus bronze medalist, the 2015 Tallinn Trophy champion, and the 2017 Russian junior national silver medalist.

She is currently the 25th highest ranked ladies' singles skater in world by the International Skating Union following the 2019-20 figure skating season.

Personal life 
Konstantinova was born on 14 July 2000 in Saint Petersburg, Russia. Her mother trained in rhythmic gymnastics and track and field and her father in karate. Her sister, Kristina, is eleven years younger.

Career 
Konstantinova began learning to skate in 2006. Valentina Chebotareva became her coach when she was nine years old. She made her international debut in November 2012 at the 2012 Tallinn Trophy, where she won the junior gold medal. In the 2015–16 season she won second gold medal at the 2015 Tallinn Trophy. In 2016–17 season she made her Junior Grand Prix debut. She won silver medal at the JGP Russia, she then placed fourth at the JGP Germany.

Konstantinova made her international senior debut at the 2016 CS Tallinn Trophy where she won gold medal with a personal best score of 186.97 points. Placing first in both programs, she won the gold medal by a margin of more than 9 points over silver medalist Serafima Sakhanovich.

2017–18 season 

In November 2017 Konstantinova competed the 2017 CS Tallinn Trophy where she won the gold medal. This was her second consecutive victory at Tallinn Trophy. Two weeks later she won the 2017 CS Golden Spin of Zagreb with a personal best score of 199.68 points.

In December 2017 she placed fourth at the 2018 Russian Championships after placing tenth in the short program and third in the free skate. She then competed at the 2018 Russian Junior Championships where she won the bronze medal.

In March 2018 Konstantinova competed at the 2018 Junior Worlds where she placed fourth after placing sixth in the short program and fifth in the free skate.  She was subsequently called up to replace Evgenia Medvedeva at the 2018 World Championships in Milan.  She was later described as having "more or less bombed" the competition, placing sixteenth in the short program and twentieth in the free skate, for nineteenth place overall.  Konstantinova would admit to being "really down after that."  She described herself as "very grateful to my family that they supported me in this difficult time, thankful to the fans that didn’t turn away from me and continued to support me. I healed my soul through work and I drew a lot of conclusions for myself."

2018–19 season 
Konstantinova started her season by competing at two ISU Challenger Series events. In mid September she won the bronze medal at the 2018 CS Ondrej Nepela Trophy and two weeks later she placed fourth at the 2018 CS Finlandia Trophy, fractions of a point behind Finnish skater Viveca Lindfors. In early November she made her Grand Prix debut at 2018 Grand Prix of Helsinki where she won the silver medal behind her teammate Alina Zagitova. In late November she finished fifth at the 2018 Internationaux de France.

At the 2019 Russian Championships, Konstantinova initially placed fourth in the short program.  In the free skate, she popped an Axel and underrotated a triple Lutz, placing fifth in the free skate and fourth overall.  Konstantinova was the highest-ranked international senior skater in the competition, 0.89 points ahead of Alina Zagitova.  Speaking afterward, she said she was "not too happy with my free as I made mistakes, but I proved that I am competitive in this field."

Konstantinova was assigned to the 2019 European Championships along with Zagitova and Sofia Samodurova, the other top senior qualifiers at the Russian Championships.  In the short program, Konstantinova doubled her attempted triple Lutz and underrotated her triple flip, as a result placing eleventh.  She placed second in the free skate, behind only Samodurova, and finished in fourth place overall, behind Samodurova, Zagitova, and Lindfors.  Competing next at the domestic Russian Cup Final, she placed second in the short program, behind only Medvedeva, but fell to sixth in the free, and was again fourth overall.  Although initially submitted as one of Russia's three entries for the 2019 World Championships, she was subsequently withdrawn and replaced by Medvedeva.

2019–20 season 
Beginning the season at the 2019 CS Ondrej Nepela Memorial, Konstantinova placed seventh.  At her first Grand Prix assignment, 2019 Skate America, she had several falls and popped jumps, finishing eleventh out of twelve skaters.  She was eleventh as well at the 2019 Rostelecom Cup.  Konstantinova finished the season at the 2020 Russian Championships.

2020–21 season 
With the COVID-19 pandemic affecting the international season, Konstantinova competed on the domestic Cup of Russia series, placing fifth at the second stage in Moscow and ninth at the fourth stage in Kazan.  As a result, she qualified for the 2021 Russian Figure Skating Championships. She placed sixteenth at the national championships. On January 13, Konstantinova announced that she'd be leaving coaches Alexander Volkov to train under Viktoria Butsaeva.

On July 29, 2022, it was reported that Stanislava Konstantinova had finished her career, but the figure skater herself denied this information, saying that she had temporarily suspended her career and would miss the new season.

Retirement 
Not competing during season 2021-2022, Konstantinova has announced her retirement from competitive skating on her Instagram and mentioned that she stays in figure skating now as a coach and choreographer.

Programs

Competitive highlights 

GP: Grand Prix; CS: Challenger Series; JGP: Junior Grand Prix

Detailed results

Senior level 

Small medals for short and free programs awarded only at ISU Championships.
Personal bests highlighted in italic.

Junior level 

Personal bests highlighted in italic.

References

External links 
 

2000 births
Russian female single skaters
Living people
Figure skaters from Saint Petersburg
Universiade medalists in figure skating
Universiade bronze medalists for Russia
Competitors at the 2019 Winter Universiade